The Central District of Taleqan County is in Taleqan County, Alborz province, Iran. At the 2006 census, the district's population (as Taleqan District of Savojbolagh County, Tehran province) was 25,781 in 7,574 households. At the 2016 census, the population of the district had decreased to 9,476 in 3,549 households, by which time its county had become a part of recently established Alborz province.

References 

Taleqan County

Districts of Alborz Province

Populated places in Alborz Province

Populated places in Taleqan County